Anjali Bhardwaj (born 1973) is an Indian social activist working on issues of transparency and accountability. She is a co-convenor of the National Campaign for People's Right to Information (NCPRI) and a founding member of Satark Nagrik Sangathan. She works on issues related to right to information, Lokpal, whistleblower protection, grievance redress, and right to food.

Early life 
Bhardwaj did her BA from Lady Sri Ram College, Delhi University, and holds an MSc degree from the University of Oxford and a master's degree from the Delhi School of Economics, Delhi University.

Work 
Bhardwaj has been involved with the right to information movement in India since 1999.  Anjali has been very vocal on the question of accountability and transparency., She is a co-convenor of the National Campaign for People's Right to Information (NCPRI). Her efforts there include working toward the Right to Information Act, 2005, the Whistle Blowers Protection Act, 2011, The Lokpal and Lokayuktas Act, 2013, and the Grievance Redress Bill.

Anjali is a founding member of Satark Nagrik Sangathan (SNS). Set up in 2003, SNS uses the Right to Information Act to help improve the accountability of the Indian government. Report Cards developed by SNS on the performance of legislators are widely publicized through the media.

She works with RTI Assessment & Advocacy Group (RAAG), which was set up in 2008 to undertake ongoing assessments of the implementation of the RTI Act.

Awards and honors 

Anjali has been honored with the "International Anticorruption Champions Award" by the US Department of State, where she was among the 12 global Anticorruption champions.
Anjali was awarded the Ashoka Fellowship for Social Entrepreneurs in 2009 for using the RTI Act to ensure transparency, accountability and responsiveness in the functioning of elected representatives. She was presented the Honour Roll of Lady Shri Ram College in 2011 for promoting transparency and accountability in governance.

Media 
She writes extensively on issues of transparency and accountability in the media:
 Peoples' Monitoring of the RTI Regime in India 2012–13
 Article on Lokpal amendments – Indian Express
 Article on Whistle Blowers Protection Act – Indian Express
 Article on Prevention of Corruption Act – The Hindu
 Article on Lokpal Act – EPW
 Article on Lokpal Bill – Economic Times
 Article on proposed amendments to the RTI Act – Outlook magazine
 Article on performance of Information Commissions – The Deccan Herald
 Article on the RTI Act – Outlook Magazine

References

External link 

1973 births
Living people
Indian women activists
Right to Information activists
Activists from Delhi